Lower Wyke is a hamlet in the Basingstoke and Deane district of Hampshire, England. It is in the civil parish of St. Mary Bourne.

Governance
The village is part of the civil parish of St Mary Bourne and is within the Evingar ward of Basingstoke and Deane borough council. The borough council is a Non-metropolitan district of Hampshire County Council.

References

Villages in Hampshire
Basingstoke and Deane